Central Chaengwattana (previously known as CentralPlaza Chaengwattana) is a shopping mall located on Chaeng Watthana Road, Pak Kret District, Nonthaburi in the Bangkok Metropolitan Area. 

The mall opened in 2008 and is the first shopping mall of Central Group, Thailand's largest retail corporation in Nonthaburi province.

Overview
The mall has a total of seven floors with a basement floor included. It is the biggest shopping mall in the northwestern part of Bangkok compromising an area of 24 rai. The cost of building the mall was 6 billion Baht. It has nine main anchors and more than 300 variety of shops, with well-known brands.
Central Chaengwattana has 10 different special zones which are:
 Fashion
 Junction-X
 Sports
 Beauty & Service
 Banking
 Books & Music
 Kids
 Education
 Home Decorative
 IT Center

The operator of the cinema in the mall is SF Cinema. It has over 500 seats and a 28 lane bowling alley locates in SF Strike Bowl with karaoke rooms. Fitness First is also an anchor with an outdoor view.
TOPS Supermarket is a supermarket located on the ground floor of the mall.
Central Chaengwattana aims to attract 60,000 – 70,000 visitors per day.

Anchors 
 Central Department Store
 Tops
 Food Patio
 Food Park
 SFX Cinema 10 Cinemas
 B2S
 Officemate
 Power Buy
 Supersports
 Fitness First
 Familymart
 Chaengwatthana Hall

Parking
The mall along with the office building have a combined parking space for 3,200 cars.

See also
List of shopping malls in Thailand
List of largest shopping malls in Thailand

Notes

References

External links
 Central Department Store
 CentralPlaza
 CentralPlaza Chaengwattana on Architecture News Plus

Shopping malls in Bangkok
Central Pattana
Shopping malls established in 2008
2008 establishments in Thailand